Noh Seung-yul (born 29 May 1991), or Seung-yul Noh is a South Korean professional golfer.

Professional career
Noh turned professional in 2007 and successfully negotiated qualifying school for the 2008 Asian Tour. He won the Midea China Classic that season, and was named Asian Tour rookie of the year. In 2010 he won the Maybank Malaysian Open which was co-sanctioned with the European Tour. The win made him the second youngest winner ever on the European Tour after Danny Lee.

He finished 2010 as the leader of the Asian Tour money list, and ranked 34th on the European Tour Order of Merit.

In December 2011, Noh finished T3 at the PGA Tour Q-School to earn his tour card for the 2012 season. This marked the first time that Noh had earned a full membership on the PGA Tour.

In 2012, he finished 49th on the PGA Tour money list and 37th in the FedEx Cup playoffs to retain his card for 2013. In 2013, he finished 153rd on the money list and missed the FedEx Cup playoffs. He played in the Web.com Tour Finals and finished fourth to regain his PGA Tour card for 2014.

On 27 April 2014, he won the Zurich Classic of New Orleans, one month before his 23rd birthday. This was his first PGA Tour victory.

In October 2017, Noh announced he would leave the PGA Tour to begin his mandatory military obligation in South Korea, just a few months after countryman Bae Sang-moon returned from his commitment.

Noh made his return to professional golf at the 2019 Shinhan Donghae Open.

Amateur wins (2)
2005 Korean Amateur, Korean Junior Amateur

Professional wins (4)

PGA Tour wins (1)

European Tour wins (1)

1Co-sanctioned by the Asian Tour

Asian Tour wins (2)

1Co-sanctioned by the European Tour

Asian Tour playoff record (0–1)

Web.com Tour wins (1)

Results in major championships

CUT = missed the half-way cut
"T" indicates a tie for a place

Summary

Most consecutive cuts made – 6 (2010 PGA – 2014 U.S. Open)
Longest streak of top-10s – 0

Results in The Players Championship

CUT = missed the halfway cut
"T" indicates a tie for a place

Results in World Golf Championships

QF, R16, R32, R64 = Round in which player lost in match play
"T" = Tied

Team appearances
Royal Trophy (representing Asia): 2011

See also
2011 PGA Tour Qualifying School graduates
2013 Web.com Tour Finals graduates

References

External links

South Korean male golfers
Asian Tour golfers
European Tour golfers
PGA Tour golfers
Korn Ferry Tour graduates
Sportspeople from Gangwon Province, South Korea
Golfers from Seoul
1991 births
Living people